Mukasovo 1-e (1-se Moqas) is a rural locality (a village) in Mukasovsky Selsoviet, Baymaksky District, Bashkortostan, Russia. The population was 114 as of 2010. There are 3 streets.

Geography 
Mukasovo 1-e is located 46 km northeast of Baymak (the district's administrative centre) by road. Mukasovo 2-e is the nearest rural locality.

References 

Rural localities in Baymaksky District